City Market is a historic market complex in the Historic District of Savannah, Georgia. Originally centered on the site of today's Ellis Square from 1733, today it stretches west from Ellis Square to Franklin Square. Established in the 1700s with a wooden building, locals gathered here for their groceries and services. This building burned in 1820 and was replaced the following year with a single-storey structure that wrapped around the square. A brick building, the work of architects Augustus Schwaab and Martin Phillip Muller, was erected in 1876. They had submitted plans to the city six years earlier. The cost of the building's construction "vastly exceeded expectations" after excavations revealed weakened arches in the basement floor that required them to be replaced. It was an ornate structure with arches in the Romanesque style and large circular windows.

The interior of the Schwaab and Muller structure encompassed 33,000 square feet. The city's mayor, John Screven, described it as "roomy, capable of being kept in the highest condition of cleanliness, with ample ventilation". The construction was headed by carpenter James C. Saltus.

The market area survived two fires (in 1796 and 1820), the Civil War, and the hurricane of 1896. It is now part of the Savannah Historic District, and is a popular destination for tourists due to its restaurants, art galleries and shops, which occupy many of the buildings erected in the 19th century.

Ellis Square parking garage controversy
In 1954, the city signed a 50-year lease with the Savannah Merchants Cooperative Parking Association, allowing the association to raze the existing structure and construct a parking garage to serve the City Market retail project. "The demolition of City Market was a disaster. That was the worst thing Savannah ever did," said preservationist Cornelia Groves. A farewell ball was held on the eve of the demolition.

Anger over the demolition of the market house helped spur the historic preservation movement (most notably the Historic Savannah Foundation) in Savannah. The outer structure of this city market building influenced the design of the Kroger grocery store on Gwinnett Street and the Publix grocery store in the Twelve Oaks shopping center on Abercorn Street.

When the garage's lease expired in 2004, the city began plans to restore Ellis Square. The old parking garage was demolished in 2006 to make way for a new public square (park) that features open spaces for public concerts, as well as an underground parking garage on Whitaker Street. The underground facility was completed and formally dedicated in January 2009.

Timeline of market buildings

–1820 – a wooden building was erected; burned down in 1820
1821–1876 – a single-storey structure was erected which wrapped around the square's center
1876–1954 – a brick structure was the third and final structure that existed; torn down by the city

Buildings in City Market
John Montmollin Warehouse
Thomas Gibbons Range

Gallery

References

Bibliography
 

Tourist attractions in Savannah, Georgia
Commercial buildings completed in 1733
Ellis Square (Savannah) buildings
Franklin Square (Savannah, Georgia) buildings
History of slavery in Georgia (U.S. state)
1733 establishments in the Thirteen Colonies
Market houses
Shopping malls in Georgia (U.S. state)
Landmarks in Savannah, Georgia